In mathematics, the idea of descent extends the intuitive idea of 'gluing' in topology. Since the topologists' glue is the use of equivalence relations on topological spaces, the theory starts with some ideas on identification.

Descent of vector bundles

The case of the construction of vector bundles from data on a disjoint union of topological spaces is a straightforward place to start.

Suppose X is a topological space covered by open sets Xi. Let Y be the disjoint union of the Xi, so that there is a natural mapping

We think of Y as 'above' X, with the Xi projection 'down' onto X. With this language, descent implies a vector bundle on Y (so, a bundle given on each Xi), and our concern is to 'glue' those bundles Vi, to make a single bundle V on X. What we mean is that V should, when restricted to Xi, give back Vi, up to a bundle isomorphism.

The data needed is then this: on each overlap

intersection of Xi and Xj, we'll require mappings

to use to identify Vi and Vj there, fiber by fiber. Further the fij must satisfy conditions based on the reflexive, symmetric and transitive properties of an equivalence relation (gluing conditions). For example, the composition

for transitivity (and choosing apt notation). The fii should be identity maps and hence symmetry becomes  (so that it is fiberwise an isomorphism).

These are indeed standard conditions in fiber bundle theory (see transition map). One important application to note is change of fiber: if the fij are all you need to make a bundle, then there are many ways to make an associated bundle. That is, we can take essentially same fij, acting on various fibers.

Another major point is the relation with the chain rule: the discussion of the way there of constructing tensor fields can be summed up as 'once you learn to descend the tangent bundle, for which transitivity is the Jacobian chain rule, the rest is just 'naturality of tensor constructions'.

To move closer towards the abstract theory we need to interpret the disjoint union of the

now as

the fiber product (here an equalizer) of two copies of the projection p. The bundles on the Xij that we must control are V′ and V", the pullbacks to the fiber of V via the two different projection maps to X.

Therefore, by going to a more abstract level one can eliminate the combinatorial side (that is, leave out the indices) and get something that makes sense for p not of the special form of covering with which we began. This then allows a category theory approach: what remains to do is to re-express the gluing conditions.

History

The ideas were developed in the period 1955–1965 (which was roughly the time at which the requirements of algebraic topology were met but those of algebraic geometry were not). From the point of view of abstract category theory the work of comonads of Beck was a summation of those ideas; see Beck's monadicity theorem.

The difficulties of algebraic geometry with passage to the quotient are acute. The urgency (to put it that way) of the problem for the geometers accounts for the title of the 1959 Grothendieck seminar TDTE on theorems of descent and techniques of existence (see FGA) connecting the descent question with the representable functor question in algebraic geometry in general, and the moduli problem in particular.

Fully faithful descent 
Let . Each sheaf F on X gives rise to a descent data:

where  satisfies the cocycle condition:
.

The fully faithful descent says:  is fully faithful. The descent theory tells conditions for which there is a fully faithful descent.

See also 
 Grothendieck connection
 Stack (mathematics)
 Galois descent
 Grothendieck topology
 Fibered category
 Beck's monadicity theorem
 Cohomological descent

References

 SGA 1, Ch VIII – this is the main reference
   A chapter on the descent theory is more accessible than SGA.

Further reading
Other possible sources include:
 Angelo Vistoli, Notes on Grothendieck topologies, fibered categories and descent theory 
 Mattieu Romagny, A straight way to algebraic stacks

External links 
What is descent theory?

Topology
Category theory
Algebraic geometry